The 2013–14 Women's CEV Cup was the 42nd edition of the European CEV Cup volleyball club tournament, the former Top Teams Cup.

Teams of the 2013–2014 season

Main phase

1/16 Finals
1st leg 22–23 October 2013
2nd leg 29–30 October 2013
The 16 winning teams from the 1/16 Finals will compete in the 1/8 Finals playing Home & Away
matches. 
The losers of the 1/16 Final matches will qualify for the 3rd round in Challenge Cup.

1/8 Finals
1st leg 4–5 December 2013
2nd leg 10–11 December 2013

1/4 Finals
1st leg 14–15 January 2014
2nd leg 22–23 January 2014

Challenge Phase
Teams from CEV Women's Champions League: Agel Prostějov, Azeryol Baku, Dresdner SC, Dinamo Romprest București
Teams from Main phase: Fenerbahçe, Polski Cukier Fakro Muszyna, Khimik Yuzhny, Uralochka-NTMK Ekaterinburg
1st leg 4–5 February 2014
2nd leg 11–12 February 2014

Final phase

Semi-finals
1st leg 25 February 2014
2nd leg 1 March 2014

Finals
1st leg 26 March 2014
2nd leg 29 March 2014

External links
 2014 Women's CEV Cup

2013-14
CEV Cup
CEV Cup